In Hindu mythology, Asikni, also known as Panchajani and Virani, is a consort of Daksha in the Puranic pantheon. Most scriptures mention her as the mother of 6000 sons and 60 daughters.

Etymology and epithets
The Sanskrit word "Asikni" means 'dark' or 'night'; it can also refer to "a girl attending woman's apartment". The word is used in the Rigveda (c. 1500 BCE) to describe the river Chenab.  

She is also known by the patronymic "Panchajani" and "Virani".

Legend

Birth 
Puranas differ about her parentage.

Devi-Bhagavata Purana, Kalika Purana, Garuda Purana, and Brahma Purana note Asikni to have been born of Brahma's left thumb. According to the Bhagavata Purana and Shiva Purana, she was the daughter of Prajapati Panchajana. 

Brahma Purana, Brahmanda Purana, Vayu Purana, Kalika Purana, Kurma Purana, Padma Purana, Garuda Purana, and Shiva Purana note her to be the daughter of Prajapati Virana.

Marriage 
The broad theme is common to Vayu Purana, Bhagavata Purana, and Brahma Purana.

Daksa was delegated by Brahma to create beings to populate the cosmos; he went on to create gods, sages, asuras, yaskhas and rakhashas from his mind, but failed to be further successful. Upon a successful penance, Vishnu granted Asikni as his wife and urged him to engage in sexual union.

Children
Through their union, numerous children were born. A common theme spans across the Brahmanda Purana, Bhagavata Purana, Linga Purana, Garuda Purana, Kurma Purana, Shiva Purana, Vishnu Purana, Vayu Purana, Padma Purana, and Brahma Purana in this regard.  

Daksha and Asikni initially produced five thousand sons, who were known as Haryasvas. They were interested in populating the Earth but upon the advice of Narada, took to discovering worldly affairs instead and never returned back. Daksha and Asikni again produced another thousand sons (Sabalasvas), who had similar intentions but were persuaded by Narada to the same results. An angry Daksha cursed Narada to be a perpetual wanderer. This time, he birthed sixty daughters from Asikni. They were married off to different sages and deities, and went on to give birth to various species.

The Shiva Purana notes that thereafter Shiva had himself reincarnated within Asikni's womb; Asikni was widely respected and eulogized by all the deities during this span. In the tenth month, Asikni gave birth to Sati; she and Daksa went on to take good care of her.

Notes

References

External links

Hindu goddesses